Briner is a surname. Notable people with the surname include:

George Briner (1862–1920), Australian politician
Justin Briner, American voice actor and singer
Robert Briner (1935–1999), American television producer